Wiktor Marek Pleśnierowicz (born 29 March 2001) is a Polish professional footballer who plays as a centre-back for Warta Poznań.

Career

In 2019, Pleśnierowicz was sent on loan to the youth academy of Italian Serie A side Roma from Lech Poznań in the Polish top flight.

On 18 June 2021, he signed a three-year contract with an option for a one-year extension with Polish Ekstraklasa club Warta Poznań. Shortly after joining his new club, he tore his anterior cruciate ligament and was sidelined for six months.

Career statistics

Club

References

External links
 
 

Living people
2001 births
Polish footballers
Association football defenders
Lech Poznań II players
Lech Poznań players
Miedź Legnica players
Warta Poznań players
Ekstraklasa players
I liga players
II liga players
III liga players
Sportspeople from Kalisz
Poland youth international footballers
Poland under-21 international footballers
Polish expatriate footballers
Expatriate footballers in Italy
Polish expatriate sportspeople in Italy
21st-century Polish people